Jean Humbert may refer to:

 Jean Humbert (painter) (1734–1794), Dutch painter
 Jean Emile Humbert (1771–1839), Dutch military engineer who rediscovered ancient Carthage
 Jean Joseph Amable Humbert (1767–1823), French general